Joseph Herscher is a YouTube personality known for his channel Joseph's Machines. Herscher is a kinetic artist who specializes in making comical chain-reaction machines. He made his first machine, the Lolly Machine, when he was five.

He was a 2013 Artist-in-Residence at the McColl Center for Art + Innovation in Charlotte, North Carolina.

Joseph was born in New York City, grew up in Wellington, New Zealand and then moved back to New York City, where he continued to create his eccentric machines. He is also a public speaker. Joseph created and starred in the 2015 comedy web series Jiwi's Machines. In July 2019, he launched a new web series, What's Your Problem?, co-created with Gemma Gracewood and made by Augusto Entertainment. , Herscher was living in London.

Many of Herscher's devices are referred to as Rube Goldberg machines.

References

External links 

 
 
 

21st-century American comedians
Living people
American people of New Zealand descent
American YouTubers
New Zealand Jews
Video bloggers
Male bloggers
1985 births